South Mountain, is a prominent traprock peak in the Hanging Hills of Meriden, Connecticut.

Most of South Mountain is located within the  Hubbard Park. The  Metacomet Trail crosses the wooded backside of South Mountain, but no official trail leads to the southern cliff face. Activities enjoyed on the mountain include hiking, and in the winter, snowshoeing and backcountry skiing.

See also
 Metacomet Ridge
 Adjacent summits:

References
 Brochure of Hubbard Park
 Connecticut Walk Book  17th ed. Connecticut Forest and Park Association.

External links
 The City of Meriden

Meriden, Connecticut
Hanging Hills
Mountains of Connecticut
Landforms of New Haven County, Connecticut